Franc Grom is an artist in Stara Vrhnika, Slovenia (near Ljubljana). He carves detailed designs on eggs shells. The designs typically include 2,000 to 3,000 holes.

References

 

Living people
Slovenian artists
Year of birth missing (living people)
People from the Municipality of Vrhnika